The following is a list of pipeline accidents in the United States in 2008. It is one of several lists of U.S. pipeline accidents. See also list of natural gas and oil production accidents in the United States.

Incidents 

This is not a complete list of all pipeline accidents. For natural gas alone, the Pipeline and Hazardous Materials Safety Administration (PHMSA), a United States Department of Transportation agency, has collected data on more than 3,200 accidents deemed serious or significant since 1987.

A "significant incident" results in any of the following consequences:
 fatality or injury requiring in-patient hospitalization
 $50,000 or more in total costs, measured in 1984 dollars
 liquid releases of five or more barrels (42 US gal/barrel)
 releases resulting in an unintentional fire or explosion

PHMSA and the National Transportation Safety Board (NTSB) post incident data and results of investigations into accidents involving pipelines that carry a variety of products, including natural gas, oil, diesel fuel, gasoline, kerosene, jet fuel, carbon dioxide, and other substances. Occasionally pipelines are repurposed to carry different products.

 On January 5, 2008, a pipeline ruptured at a filet weld, leaking natural gasoline in Oologah, Oklahoma. About 45,000 gallons of the gasoline were spilled, with about 29,000 gallons being lost.
 On January 7, a pipeline split open, near Denver City, Texas, spilling  of crude oil. The pipeline company failed to detect and stop the leak for more than 24 hours. ERW seam failure appears to be the cause.
 On January 11, a Belle Fourche maintenance crew damaged its own pipeline, spilling about 11,100 gallons of crude in Alexander, North Dakota.
 On February 5, a natural gas pipeline compressor station exploded and caught fire, near Hartsville, Tennessee, and was believed to have been caused by a tornado hitting the facility.
 On February 15, a 20-inch distillate pipeline exploded and burned in Hidalgo County, Texas, closing road FM490.
 On March 14, a house in a Columbia, Missouri neighborhood exploded in an explosion that could be felt for miles, causing fatal injuries to the elderly couple living there. Problems with the gas distribution line there were blamed for the explosion. Another house nearby also suffered damage.
 On May 16, a crew boring to install a new gas main hit an existing 4-inch gas line in McKinney, Texas. Escaping gas caused two houses to explode, and one other house to catch fire. Three people were burned from this incident.
 On July 28, the U.S. District Court for the Southern District of Illinois ordered Apex Oil Company Inc., to clean up ground water and soil contamination, at an expected cost of at least $150 million. During the period 1967 through 1988, Apex Oil's legal predecessor, Clark Oil and Refining Corp., released gasoline from leaking pipelines and other spills, that commingled with other responsible parties' releases and resulted in the large plume of refined petroleum substances beneath Hartford, Illinois. Vapors from the underground plume of millions of gallons of leaked and spilled petroleum products have migrated into houses in the village, causing years of fires, explosions, and evacuations.
 On August 10, a 20-inch crude oil pipeline ruptured near Golden Gate, Illinois. About 243,000 gallons of crude were spilled, with about 33,000 gallons being lost. The cause was listed as a pipe seam failure.
 On August 25, a 24-inch gas transmission pipeline failed in a rural area west of Pilot Grove, Missouri. The longitudinal rupture in the pipe body created a 50 foot by 33-foot by 7-foot deep crater in the ground. The cause of the rupture was external corrosion.
The failure was caused by external corrosion.
 On August 29, a 24-inch gas transmission pipeline ruptured in Cooper County, Missouri. Corrosion had caused the pipeline to lose 75% of its wall thickness in the failure area.
 On September 9, workers constructing a new pipeline hit an existing natural gas pipeline in Wheeler County, Texas. Two workers were burned by this accident.
 On September 14, a 30-inch Williams Companies gas pipeline ruptured and gas ignited near Appomattox, Virginia. Two houses were destroyed by the fire. External corrosion was the cause of the failure.
 On September 23, a ruptured pipeline caused a fire at a Pipeline Terminal in Pasadena, Texas. The failure was caused by internal corrosion.
 On October 3, a crew working on a Turnpike expansion drilled into a Colonial Pipeline petroleum products pipeline, in Hamilton, New Jersey. About 35,000 gallons of diesel fuel were spilled, with 100 gallons not recovered.
 On October 3, construction equipment hit a Mid Valley Pipeline Company pipeline in Florence, Kentucky, spilling about 153,000 gallons of crude oil.
 On the night of November 15, a gas compressor for a pipeline at an entry exploded and burned near Godley, Texas. The fire spread to another company's gas compressor station next to it. A 24-inch gas pipeline had to be shut down to stop the fire. There were no injuries, and damages were estimated at $2 million.
 On November 25, a gasoline release from a Sunoco petroleum pipeline occurred, near a retail mall in Murrysville, Pennsylvania. Officials said the release occurred from the 6-inch line at about 9:30 a.m. while a Sunoco Logistics crew was working on a ball valve. It was suspected the ball valve was improperly installed.
 On December 5, a driver of a vehicle went off of a road, and struck a valve on an AMOCO gasoline pipeline in Colon, Michigan. The driver was killed, and, the fire burned for several days. About 14,000 gallons of gasoline were burned, or lost.

References 

Lists of pipeline accidents in the United States
2008 disasters in the United States